Mount Shabani is located in Duhok Governorate in the Kurdistan Region, Iraq.

Gallery

References

Mountains of Iraq
Dohuk Governorate